Ilham (Ghali, Ali, Ilham, Aleham, Tatar: İlham, Ğäli) (c. 1449 – c. 1490) was a khan of Kazan Khanate in 1479–1484 and 1485–1487. For more see Möxämmädämin of Kazan.

See also
 List of Kazan khans

References
 

1440s births
1490s deaths
Khanate of Kazan
15th-century monarchs in Europe